Pozuelo may refer to:

People
Alejandro Pozuelo, Spanish footballer
Nemesio Pozuelo, Soviet footballer

Places
Pozuelo, Albacete, municipality in Albacete
Pozuelo de Alarcón, municipality in the Community of Madrid
Pozuelo de Aragón, municipality in Zaragoza
Pozuelo de Tábara, municipality in Zamora
Pozuelo del Páramo, municipality in León
El Pozuelo, municipality in Cuenca
Pozuelo de Calatrava, municipality in Ciudad Real
Pozuelo del Rey, municipality in the Community of Madrid
Pozuelo Oeste (Madrid Metro)
Pozuelo de la Orden, municipality in Valladolid
Pozuelo de Zarzón, municipality in Cáceres
San Bartolomé, Pozuelo, parish church in the small town of Pozuelo

Other
CF Pozuelo de Alarcón, football club
CF Pozuelo de Alarcón Femenino, football club

Spanish-language surnames